A child prodigy is defined in psychology research literature as a person under the age of ten who produces meaningful output in some domain to the level of an adult expert performer. This is a list of young children (under age 10) who displayed a talent in music deemed to make them competitive with skilled adult musicians. The list is sorted by genre and instrument.

Classical

Piano

Strings

Joseph Joachim (1831–1907)
Jascha Heifetz (1901–1987)
Yehudi Menuhin (1916–1999)
Ida Haendel (1928–2020)
Yo-Yo Ma (born 1955)

Composing

Notes

References

Further reading
Musical Prodigies: Masters at an Early Age by Renee B. Fisher 
Musical Prodigies: Perilous Journeys, Remarkable Lives by Claude Kenneson 

Prodigies